The 1998 Atatürk Cup was a single football match contested between 1998 Presidential Cup winners Beşiktaş and 1998 Chancellor Cup winners Fenerbahçe. Fenerbahçe won the game 2–0.

Match details

References

 

Atatürk Cup
Atatürk Cup
Atatürk Cup 1998
Atatürk Cup 1998